Moccasin Creek is a stream in the U.S. state of South Dakota.

Moccasin Creek most likely derives its name from "moccasin flower" a variant name of Cypripedioideae.

Moccasin Creek Country Club is named after this stream.

See also
List of rivers of South Dakota

References

Rivers of Brown County, South Dakota
Rivers of South Dakota